The Chien Français Blanc et Orange is a breed of dog of the scenthound type, originating in France. The breed is used for hunting in packs and descends from the old Hound of Saintonge type of large hunting dog.

Appearance 
The breed is a typical large French hunting pack hound, with a lean and muscular body, long legs, slightly domed head, long drop ears, and slightly square flews. Size is 62 to a maximum of 70 cm (23.6 to 27.6 ins) at the withers, making it slightly smaller than the Chien Français Blanc et Noir.

The colour of the coat is white and orange, but the orange should never appear to be a red colour. The dog's skin is the same colour as the fur, orange under the orange fur and white under the white fur. Faults are listed as physical or behavioural abnormalities, and a dog with such faults should not be bred.

The breed is noted for its perseverance on the hunt as well as a good nose and voice. Unusual for pack dogs, it is friendly and easy for humans to manage.

Use 
The Chien Français Blanc et Orange are pack-hunting dogs, which means that groups of dogs are hunted together, always directed by a human, not running about hunting by themselves.

See also
 Dogs portal
 List of dog breeds
 Anglo-French Hounds
 Dog terminology

References

External links 
 Search The Open Directory Project (DMOZ) links for clubs and information about the Français blanc et orange 

FCI breeds
Scent hounds
Rare dog breeds
Dog breeds originating in France